Robert Evanchick (born 21 July 1957) is an American law enforcement officer and current Commissioner of the Pennsylvania State Police.

Law enforcement career

Early career 
A native of the Wilkes-Barre area Evanchick was hired and served in the Wilkes Barre Police Department starting in 1979. He was a patrol officer for the department and after two years left for the state police.

Pennsylvania State Police 
Evanchick joined the Pennsylvania State Police in 1981.

On June 4, 2019, Evanchick was confirmed by the Pennsylvania State Senate as the next Commissioner of the Pennsylvania State Police, he had previously served as the Acting Commissioner since March 24, 2018 when he was appointed by Pennsylvania Governor Tom Wolf.

See also 
 List of Superintendents and Commissioners of the Pennsylvania State Police

References 

1957 births
Living people
State cabinet secretaries of Pennsylvania
Pennsylvania State Police
American state police officers